So-won is a Korean feminine given name. Its meaning differs based on the hanja used to write each syllable of the name. There are 68 hanja with the reading "so" and 46 hanja with the reading  "won" on the South Korean government's official list of hanja which may be used in given names. It also means "wish, hope" in Korean.

People with this name include:

Kal So-won (born 2006), South Korean actress

Fictional characters with this name include:

Im So-won, in 2013 South Korean film Hope

See also
List of Korean given names

References

Korean feminine given names